This is a list of 762 books by Enid Blyton (1897–1968), an English children's writer who also wrote under the pseudonym of Mary Pollock. She was one of the most successful children's storytellers of the 20th century.

1920s

1922
Child Whispers

1923
Real Fairies: Poems chocolate 
Responsive Singing Games

1924
The Enid Blyton Book of Fairies
Songs of Gladness
Sports and Games
Ten Songs from 'Child Whispers''', music by Sydney TwinnThe Zoo Book1925The Enid Blyton Book of Bunnies1926Book of Brownies, illustrator Ernest ArisThe Bird Book1927A Book of Little PlaysThe Play's the Thing, illustrator Alfred Bestall, music Alex Rowley, as Plays for Older Children and Plays for Younger Children, 1940Silver and Gold, illustrator Ethel EverettThe Wonderful AdventureThe Animal Book1929The Book Around EuropeEnid Blyton's Nature Lessons1930s

1930The Knights of the Round Table, John O'London's Children's LibraryTales from the Arabian Nights, John O'London's Children's LibraryTales of Ancient Greece, John O'London's Children's LibraryTales of Robin Hood, John O'London's Children's LibraryWendy Wins ThroughThe Luck of the Laytons1933Cheerio!My First Reading BookRead To UsLet's ReadFive-minute TalesLetters from BobsNews Chronicle's Boys and Girls Annual1934Brer Rabbit Retold Old Thatch seriesThe Adventures of OdysseusNews Chronicle Boys' & Girls' Story Book No 2Children of Other Days, Old Thatch seriesHappy Stories Treasure Trove Readers Book IThe Enid Blyton Poetry BookThe Red Pixie BookRound the Year with Enid Blyton: SpringRound the Year with Enid Blyton: SummerRound the Year with Enid Blyton: AutumnRound the Year with Enid Blyton: Winter The Story of the Siege of TroyThe Strange Tale of Mr. Wumble, Old Thatch seriesTales of the Ancient Greeks and PersiansTales of the RomansTen-Minute TalesThe Talking Teapot, Old Thatch series

1935Birds at Home, Old Thatch seriesNews Chronicle Boys' & Girls' Story Book No 3The Children's GardenThe Green Goblin Book, republished in abridged form in 1951 as Feefo, Tuppeny and Jinks after the characters in the bookHedgerow Tales, illustrator Vere TempleSix Enid Blyton Plays1936News Chronicle Boys' and Girls' Story Book No. 4 The Famous Jimmy, illustrator Benjamin RabierFifteen-Minute TalesThe Yellow Fairy Book1937Adventures of the Wishing-Chair, illustrator Hilda McGavin, The Wishing-Chair series 1News Chronicle Boys' and Girls' Story Book No. 5 A Book of Magic, Old Thatch seriesMore Letters from Bobs1938The Adventures of Binkle and Flip, illustrator Katherine NixonBilly-Bob Tales, illustrator May SmithHeyo, Brer Rabbit!, illustrator Kathleen NixonMr. Galliano's Circus, Circus Series 1The Secret Island, illustrator E. H. Davie, Secret Series 1

1939The Adventures of Bobs, (later illustrator Lilian Chivers), Old Thatch seriesBoys' and Girls' Circus BookCameo Plays, Book 4Children of Other Lands, Old Thatch seriesThe Enchanted Wood, illustrator Dorothy M. Wheeler, Faraway Tree Series 1Hurrah for the Circus, Circus Series 2The Little Tree House, Josie, Click and Bun 1Naughty Amelia Jane!, Amelia Jane 1The Watchman with 100 Eyes, Old Thatch series

1940s

1940Birds of Our Gardens, illustrators Ernest Aris and Roland GreenBobs AgainThe News Chronicle Boys' and Girls' Annual, illustrators Kay Nixon (Kathleen Irene Blundell-Nixon) and Ernest ArisBoys and Girls Story Book 6, illustrator Dorothy M. WheelerThe Children of Cherry Tree Farm: A Tale of the Countryside, illustrator Harry RountreeThe Children of Kidillin, as Mary PollockLet's Have a StoryMister Meddle's Mischief, illustrators Joyce Mercer and Rosalind M. TurveyThe Naughtiest Girl in the School, illustrator W. Lindsay Cable, Naughtiest Girl series 1The Secret of Spiggy Holes, illustrator E. H. Davie, Secret series 2Sunny Stories AnnualTales of Betsy-May, illustrator J. Gale ThomasThe Treasure Hunters, illustrators Edith Wilson and M. Joyce DaviesThree Boys and a Circus, as Mary PollockTwenty-Minute Tales1941The Adventurous Four, illustrator E. H. DavieAdventures of Mr. Pink-Whistle Enid Blyton's Book of the Year, illustrator Harry Rountree, music by Alec RowleyFive O'Clock Tales, illustrator Dorothy M. WheelerThe Further Adventures of Josie, Click and Bun, Josie, Click and Bun 2The Secret Mountain, illustrator Harry Rountree, Secret Series 3The Twins at St. Clare's, illustrator W. Lindsay Cable (later Jenny Chapple), St. Clare's series 1

1942Bed-Time Stories, illustrator Vernon Soper, Evans Little Books 2, published by Evans BrothersBrer Rabbit, illustrator Alfred Kerr, Evans Little Books 1, published by Evans BrothersThe Children of Willow Farm, illustrator Harry RountreeCircus Days Again, Circus series 2Five on a Treasure Island, illustrator Eileen Soper, Famous Five series 1The Further Adventures of Brer Rabbit, illustrator Ernest ArisEnid Blyton's Happy Story Book, illustrator Eileen SoperHappy Stories, illustrator Alfred Kerr, Evans Little Books 6, published by Evans BrothersHello, Mr. Twiddle!, illustrator Hilda McGavinHo Ho and Too Smart, illustrator Alfred Kerr, Evans Little Books 4, published by Evans BrothersI'll Tell You a Story, illustrator Eileen SoperJohn Jolly at Christmas TimeJolly Tales, illustrator Alfred Kerr, Evans Little Books 3, published by Evans BrothersThe Land of Far-Beyond, illustrator Horace J KnowlesMary Mouse and the Doll's House, Mary Mouse 1More Adventures on Willow Farm, illustrator Eileen Soper,The Naughtiest Girl Again, illustrator W. Lindsay Cable, Naughtiest Girl series 2The O'Sullivan Twins, illustrator W. Lindsay Cable (later Jenny Chapple), St. Clare's Series 2Enid Blyton Readers 3, illustrator Eileen SoperShadow the Sheep Dog, illustrator Lucy Gee (later illustrator G. W. Backhouse)Six O'Clock Tales, illustrator Dorothy M. WheelerTales of the Toys, illustrator Alfred Kerr, Evans Little Books 5, published by Evans Brothers

1943The Adventures of Scamp, as Mary Pollock (1951 illustrator Olive Openshaw, 1992 illustrator Beryl Sanders)Bimbo and Topsy, illustrator Lucy GeeThe Children's Life of Christ, illustrator Eileen SoperFive Go Adventuring Again, illustrator Eileen A. Soper, Famous Five series 2The Further Adventures of Josie, Click and Bun!I'll Tell You Another Story, illustrator Eileen SoperJohn Jolly at the CircusJohn Jolly by the SeaJohn Jolly on the FarmThe Magic Faraway Tree, illustrator Dorothy M. Wheeler, Faraway Tree series 2Enid Blyton's Merry Story Book, illustrator Eileen SoperMore Adventures of Mary Mouse, illustrator Olive Openshaw, Mary Mouse 2The Mystery of the Burnt Cottage, illustrator Joseph Abbey, The Five Find-Outers 1Polly Piglet, illustrator Eileen Soper (later as Brockhampton Little Book 11)The Secret of Killimooin, illustrator Eileen Soper, Secret Series 4The Secret of Cliff Castle, writing as Mary PollockSeven O'Clock Tales, illustrator Dorothy M. WheelerSmuggler Ben, by Mary Pollock, illustrator E. H. Davie,Mischief at St. Rollo's (as Mary Pollock)Summer Term at St. Clare's, illustrator W. Lindsay Cable, St. Clare's series 3The Toys Come to Life, illustrator Eileen Soper

1944At Appletree FarmBilly and Betty at the SeasideA Book of Naughty Children, illustrator Eileen SoperThe Boy Next DoorThe Boy with the Loaves and Fishes, illustrator Elsie WalkerThe Christmas Book, illustrator Treyer EvansCome to the Circus (A) (duplicated title), illustrator Eileen SoperDaily Mail Annual for Boys & Girls 1944, editorThe Dog That Went To Fairyland, illustrator Eileen SoperEight O'Clock Tales, illustrator Dorothy M. WheelerJolly Little Jumbo, illustrator Eileen SoperEnid Blyton's Jolly Story Book, illustrator Eileen SoperEnid Blyton's Nature Lover's Book, illustrators Donia Nachshen and Noel Hopking, published by Evans BrothersFive Run Away Together, illustrator Eileen Soper, Famous Five series 3The Island of Adventure, illustrator Stuart Tresilian, The Adventure Series 1Little Mary Mouse Again, illustrator Olive F. Openshaw, Mary Mouse 3The Mystery of the Disappearing Cat, illustrator Joseph Abbey, The Five Find-Outers 2Rainy Day Stories, illustrator Nora S. Unwin, published by Evans BrothersThe Second Form at St. Clare's, illustrator W. Lindsay Cable, St. Clare's series 4Tales from the Bible, illustrator Eileen SoperTales of ToylandThe Three GolliwogsClaudine at St.Clare's, illustrator W. Lindsay Cable, St. Clare's series 5The Train that Lost its Way, illustrator Eileen Soper

1945A Book of Magic, Old Thatch seriesThe Blue Story Book, illustrator Eileen SoperThe Brown Family. London to the Seaside, and Building a House, illustrators E. and R. BuhlerThe Caravan Family, illustrator William FyffeThe Conjuring Wizard and Other StoriesThe Family at Red-Roofs, illustrator W. SpenceFifth Formers of St. Clare's, W. Lindsay Cable, St. Clare's series 6The First ChristmasFive Go to Smuggler's Top, illustrator Eileen Soper, Famous Five series 4Hello, Little Mary Mouse, illustrator Olive Openshaw, Mary Mouse 4Hollow Tree House, illustrator Elizabeth WallThe Mystery of the Secret Room, illustrator Joseph Abbey, The Five Find-Outers 3The Naughtiest Girl is a Monitor, illustrator Kenneth Lovell, Naughtiest Girl series 3The Nature Lover's Book, illustrators Noel Hopking and Donia Nachshen, Evans BrothersRound the Year Stories, Old Thatch seriesThe Runaway Kitten, illustrator Eileen Soper, Brockhampton Enid Blyton Picture BookEnid Blyton's Sunny Story Book, illustrator Eileen SoperThe Teddy Bear's Party, illustrator Eileen Soper, Little Book 5, 1989 reprint as The Night The Toys Had A Party, illustrator Susan PearsonThe Twins Go to Nursery-Rhyme Land, illustrator Eileen Soper, Brockhampton Enid Blyton Picture Book

1946Amelia Jane Again, Amelia Jane 2The Bad Little Monkey, illustrator Eileen SoperThe Castle of Adventure, illustrator Stuart Tresilian, The Adventure Series 2The Children at Happy House, illustrator Kathleen GellChimney Corner StoriesFirst Term at Malory Towers, illustrator Stanley Lloyd, Malory Towers 1Five Go Off in a Caravan, illustrator Eileen Soper, Famous Five series 5The Folk of the Faraway Tree, illustrator Dorothy M. Wheeler, Faraway Tree Series 3Enid Blyton's Gay Story Book, illustrator Eileen SoperJosie, Click and Bun Again, strip book, illustrator Dorothy Wheeler, Josie Click and Bun 3The Little White Duck and Other Stories, illustrator Eileen A. SoperMary Mouse and her Family, illustrator Olive Openshaw, Mary Mouse 5The Mystery of the Spiteful Letters, illustrator Joseph Abbey, The Five Find-Outers 4The Put-Em-Rights, illustrator Elizabeth WallThe Red Story Book, illustrator Eileen SoperThe Surprising Caravan, illustrator Eileen Soper, Brockhampton Enid Blyton Picture BookThe Train that Lost its Way, illustrator Eileen Soper (later Brockhampton Little Book 10)

1947The Adventurous Four Again!, illustrator Jessie LandFive on Kirrin Island Again, illustrator Eileen Soper, Famous Five series 6The Green Story Book, illustrator Eileen SoperThe Happy House Children Again, illustrator Kathleen GellHere Comes Mary Mouse Again, illustrator Olive Openshaw, Mary Mouse 6The Enid Blyton Holiday BookSecond Holiday BookThe House at the Corner, illustrator Elsie WalkerThe Little Green Duck and Other Stories, illustrator Eileen Soper, Bedtime SeriesLucky Story Book, illustrator Eileen SoperMore About Josie, Click and Bun, strip book, illustrator Dorothy Wheeler, Josie Click and Bun 4The Mystery of the Missing Necklace, illustrator Joseph Abbey, The Five Find-Outers 5The Second Book of Naughty ChildrenRambles With Uncle NatThe Saucy Jane Family, illustrator Ruth GervisSecond Form at Malory Towers, illustrator Stanley Lloyd, Malory Towers 2The Smith Family 1–3Enid Blyton's TreasuryThe Valley of Adventure, illustrator Stuart Tresilian, The Adventure Series 3The Very Clever Rabbit, illustrator Eileen Soper, Enid Blyton Bedtime Series

1948The Adventures of Pip, illustrator Raymond SheppardMy Enid Blyton Brer Rabbit Book BR1Come to the Circus!(B) (duplicated title), illustrator Joyce M. JohnsonFive Go Off to Camp, illustrator Eileen Soper, Famous Five series 7Third Holiday BookHow Do You Do, Mary Mouse, illustrator Olive Openshaw, Mary Mouse 7Just Time for a Story, illustrator Grace LodgeLet's Have A Story, illustrator George BoweThe Little Girl at Capernaum, illustrator Elsie WalkerMister Icy-ColdMore Adventures of Pip, illustrator Raymond SheppardNow For a Story, illustrator Frank VartyThe Mystery of the Hidden House, illustrator Joseph Abbey, The Five Find-Outers 6The Red-Spotted Handkerchief and Other Stories, illustrator Kathleen GellThe Sea of Adventure, illustrator Stuart Tresilian, The Adventure Series 4Secret of the Old MillSix Cousins at Mistletoe Farm, illustrator Peter BeigelTales After TeaTales of Old Thatch, Coker editionTales of the Twins, illustrator Eileen SoperThey Ran Away Together, illustrator Jeanne FarrarThird Year at Malory Towers, illustrator Stanley Lloyd, Malory Towers 3We Want a Story, illustrator George Bowe, Pitkin

1949My Enid Blyton Bedside Book, Arthur BarkerEnid Blyton Bible Stories: Old TestamentEnid Blyton Pictures: Old TestamentBluebell Story BookA Book of MagicMy Enid Blyton Book, illustrator Cicely Steed, 2Bumpy and His Bus, illustrator Dorothy M. WheelerA Cat in Fairyland and Other Stories, PitkinChuff The Chimney Sweep and other stories, PitkinThe Circus Book, illustrator R. WebsterDaffodil Story BookThe Dear Old Snow Man, Brockhampton Nursery SeriesDon't be Silly, Mr. TwiddleThe Enchanted Sea and Other Stories, illustrator E. H. DavieFive Get into Trouble, illustrator Eileen Soper, Famous Five series 8Good Morning Book, illustrator Don and Ann GoringFourth Holiday Book, illustrator Mary K. Lee and Eelco M. T. H. Van der Beek, cover Hilda BoswellHumpty Dumpty and Belinda, illustrator Sally GeeJinky's Joke and other stories, illustrator Kathleen GellLittle Noddy Goes to Toyland, illustrated by Harmsen van der Beek, Noddy Library 1The Mountain of Adventure, illustrator Stuart Tresilian, The Adventure Series 5Mr. Tumpy and his Caravan, illustrator Dorothy WheelerThe Mystery of the Pantomime Cat, illustrator Joseph Abbey, The Five Find-Outers 7Oh, What a Lovely Time, illustrator Jeanne Farrar, Brockhampton PressEnid Blyton's Robin Hood Book, illustrator Joyce Johnson, Latimer HouseThe Rockingdown Mystery, illustrator Gilbert Dunlop, The Barney Mysteries 1The Secret Seven, illustrator George Brook, Secret Seven series 1A Story Party at Green Hedges, illustrator Grace LodgeThe Strange Umbrella and Other Stories, illustrators E. H. Davie and M. ThorpTales After Supper, illustrator Eileen SoperThose Dreadful Children, illustrator Grace LodgeEnid Blyton's Tiny Tales, illustrator Eileen SoperUpper Fourth at Malory Towers, illustrator Stanley Lloyd, Malory Towers 4

1950s

1950The Astonishing Ladder and Other Stories, illustrator Eileen SloperEnid Blyton's Second Bedside BookFive Fall into Adventure, illustrator Eileen Soper, Famous Five series 9Fifth Holiday BookHurrah for Little Noddy, illustrator Harmsen Van Beek, Noddy Library 2In the Fifth at Malory Towers, illustrator Stanley Lloyd, Malory Towers 5Jolly Little Jumbo, illustrator Eileen Soper, Little Book 12 (?date)The Magic Knitting Needles and Other Stories, illustrator Eileen SloperMister Meddle's Muddles, illustrators Rosalind M. Turvey and Joyce MercerMr. Pink-Whistle Interferes, illustrator Dorothy M. WheelerThe Mystery of the Invisible Thief, illustrator Treyer Evans, The Five Find-Outers 8The Pole Star Family, illustrator Ruth GervisPoppy Story BookThe Rilloby Fair Mystery, illustrator Gilbert Dunlop, The Barney Mysteries 2A Rubbalong Tale, Werner Laurie peep-bookRubbalong Tales, illustrator Meredith NormanThe Seaside Family, illustrator Ruth GervisThe Ship of Adventure, illustrator Stuart Tresilian, The Adventure Series 6Secret Seven Adventure, illustrator George Brook, Secret Seven series 2Six Cousins Again, illustrator Maurice TullochTales About Toys, illustrator Jeanne Farrar, Brockhampton Little Books 1The Three Naughty Children and Other Stories, illustrator Eileen SloperTricky the Goblin and Other Stories, illustrator Eileen SloperWe Do Love Mary Mouse, illustrator Olive Openshaw, Mary Mouse 8Welcome, Mary Mouse, illustrator Olive Openshaw, Mary Mouse 9What an Adventure, illustrator Eileen Soper, Little Book 2The Wishing Chair Again, illustrator Hilda McGavin, Wishing Chair series 2The Yellow Story Book, illustrator Eileen Soper

1951Enid Blyton's Third Bedside BookBenny and the Princess, Pitkin Pleasure BookThe Big Bedtime StoryThe Big Noddy Book 1Boody the Great Goblin and Other Stories, illustrator Gordon RobinsonThe Buttercup Farm Family, illustrator Ruth GervisButtercup Story BookDown at the Farm with Enid BlytonFather Christmas and BelindaFive on a Hike Together, illustrator Eileen Soper, Famous Five series 10The Flying Goat and Other Stories, PitkinHello Twins, illustrator Eileen Soper, Little Book 4Here Comes Noddy Again!, Noddy Library 4Sixth Holiday BookHurrah for Mary Mouse, illustrator Olive Openshaw, Mary Mouse 10Enid Blyton's Jolly Story BookLast Term at Malory Towers, illustrator Stanley Lloyd, Malory Towers 6Let's Go to the CircusEnid Blyton's Lucky Story BookMr. Pink-Whistle Comes Along & Other TalesThe Mystery of the Vanished Prince, illustrator Treyer Evans, The Five Find-Outers 9Noddy and Big Ears Have a Picnic Noddy's House of Books 6Noddy and His Car, Noddy Library 3Noddy Goes to the Seaside Noddy's House of Books 3Noddy Has a Shock Noddy's House of Books 4Noddy Has more Adventures Noddy's House of Books 2Noddy Off to Rocking Horse Land Noddy's House of Books 5Noddy has some Adventures, hardback strip bookNoddy Painting BookA Picnic Party with Enid BlytonPippy the Gnome and Other Stories, PitkinA Prize for Mary Mouse, illustrator Olive Openshaw, Mary Mouse 11The Proud Golliwog, illustrator Molly Brett, Little Book 3The Queen Elizabeth Family, illustrator Ruth GervisThe Ring O' Bells Mystery, illustrator Gilbert Dunlop, The Barney Mysteries 3The Rubadub Mystery, illustrator Gilbert Dunlop, The Barney Mysteries 4Runaway Teddy Bear and Other Stories, illustrator Eileen Soper, E. H. Davie et al., Pitkin Pleasure BookThe Six Bad Boys, illustrator Mary GernatEnid Blyton's Sunny Story BookTales from the Arabian NightsToo-Wise the Wonderful Wizard and Other Stories, PitkinTrouble for the Twins, illustrator Eileen Soper, Little Books 18The Little Spinning House, Pitkin Pleasure BookA Tale of Little Noddy, Noddy's House of Books 1Up the Faraway Tree, illustrator Dorothy Wheeler, Faraway Tree series 4Well Done Secret Seven, illustrator George Brook, Secret Seven series 3

1952The Adventurous Four AgainEnid Blyton's Animal Lover's Book, illustrator James Lucas, E. C. Mansell, Norman R. SatchelEnid Blyton's Fourth Bedside BookBig Ears Loses Some Jewels, Noddy's Ark of Books 2Big Noddy Book 2Bob the Little Jockey illustrator Pierre Probst, Little Gift BookThe Bonfire FolkThird Brer Rabbit Book Enid Blyton's Bright Story BookThe Circus of Adventure, Adventure Series 7Come Along Twins, illustrator Eileen Soper, Little Books 9Don't Be Silly, Mr. Twiddle!Enid Blyton's Gay Story BookEnid Blyton's Good Morning Book, illustrator Willy SchermeléEnid Blyton's Noddy Song BookEnid Blyton's Omnibus!, illustrator Jessie Land, mixed short storiesFive Have a Wonderful Time, illustrator Eileen Soper, Famous Five series 11The Funny Boy & Other TalesHere's the Naughtiest Girl!Seventh Holiday BookThe Mad Teapot, illustrator Mandy BrettThe Magic Needle & Other TalesMandy Mops and Cubby Again, strip bookMandy, Mops and Cubby Find a House, strip bookMary Mouse and her Bicycle, illustrator Olive Openshaw, Mary Mouse 12Mary Mouse and the Noah's Ark, illustrator Olive Openshaw, Mary Mouse 13Mister Meddle's MischiefMr. Tumpy Plays a Trick on Saucepan, illustrator Dorothy WheelerMr. Twiddle's Trumpet & Other TalesMy First Enid Blyton bookMy First Nature Book: The Brownie's MagicMy Second Nature Book: The Spell That Went WrongThe Mystery of the Strange Bundle, illustrator Treyer Evans, The Five Find-Outers 10New Testament Bible PlatesNoddy and Big EarsNoddy and the Three Bears, Noddy's Ark of Books 3Noddy Colour Strip Book, hardback strip bookNoddy Goes to School, Noddy Library 6Noddy's Penny Wheel Car, strip bookNoddy and the Big Balloon, Noddy's Ark of Books 5Noddy and the Flying Elephant, Noddy's Ark of Books 1Noddy and the Witch's Wand, strip bookNoddy's Car Gets a Squeak, strip bookNoddy's Car Rides in the Air, Noddy's Ark of Books 4Pippi the Little Panther illustrator Pierre Probst, Little Gift BookThe Queer Adventure, illustrator Norman MeredithRuby StorybookThe Rat-a-Tat Mystery, illustrator Gilbert Dunlop, The Barney Mysteries 5Scamp Goes on Holiday, illustrator Pierre Probst, Little Gift BookSecret Seven on the Trail, illustrator George Brook, Secret Seven series 4Snowdrop Story BookThe Snowman in Boots & Other Tales The Story of My Life autobiographyThe Enid Blyton Story Time BookTales of Green HedgesThe Very Big Secret, illustrator Ruth GervisWelcome Josie, Click and Bun!, strip book, illustrator Dorothy Wheeler, Josie Click and Bun 5Well Done Noddy!, Noddy Library 5

1953The Animal Book, illustrator Kathleen NixonEnid Blyton's Fifth Bedside Book, illustrator Catherine ScholzBefore I Go to SleepBible StoriesBig Bedtime Book, illustrator Mary BrooksBig Noddy Book 3Bimbo and His Cousin, illustrator Pierre Probst, Hackett's Little Gift BooksEnid Blyton's Fourth Brer Rabbit BookChimney Corner StoriesEnid Blyton's Christmas Story, advent calendarClicky and the Flying Horse, illustrator Molly BrettClicky the Clockwork Clown, illustrator Molly BrettFive Go Down to the Sea, illustrator Eileen Soper, Famous Five series 12Go Ahead Secret Seven, illustrator Bruno Kay, Secret Seven series 5Gobo and Mr. Fierce, strip bookThe Golliwog Grumbled, as Little Book 17 (1955)Here Come the Twins, illustrator Eileen Soper, Little Book 13Here Comes Little Noddy, illustrator BeekEighth Holiday BookMandy Makes Cubby a Hat, illustrator Dorothy WheelerMr. Tumpy in the Land of Wishes, illustrator Dorothy WheelerEnid Blyton's My Book of Fables, from the Tales of La Fontaine, illustrator Simon RomainThe Mystery of Holly Lane, illustrator Treyer Evans, The Five Find-Outers series 11New Noddy Colour Strip Book, illustrator Beek, hardback strip bookMy Fifth Nature BookNoddy and Jimmy Giraffe, Noddy's Garage of Books 5Noddy and the Cuckoo's Nest, strip bookNoddy and the Naughty Toys, Noddy's Garage of Books 2Noddy at the Seaside, illustrator Beek, Noddy Library 7Noddy Gets Captured, illustrator Beek, strip bookNoddy is Very Silly, strip bookNoddy Loses His Clothes, Noddy's Garage of Books 1Noddy Makes a Mistake, Noddy's Garage of Books 3Noddy Wins a Prize, Noddy's Garage of Books 4Patapouf's Circus, illustrator Pierre Probst, Little Gift Book/Collins Wonder Colour BookThe Secret of Moon Castle, illustrator Dorothy Hall, Secret Series 5Snowball the Pony, illustrator Iris GillespieThe Story of Our Queen, illustrator F. Stocks MayTenth Tell-a-Story BookVisitors in the Night, illustrator Molly Brett, Brockhampton Little Books 14Well, Really Mr. Twiddle, illustrator Hilda McGavin

1954The Adventure of the Secret Necklace, illustrator Isabel VeeversThe Adventures of Scamp, illustrator Olive OpenshawAnimal Tales, Collins Wonder Colour BookAnimals at Home, Old Thatch seriesAway Goes Sooty, Collins Wonder Colour BookEnid Blyton's Sixth Bedside BookBig Noddy BookBimbo the Little Kitten, Little Gift BookBimbo and Blackie, Little Gift BookBimbo and Blackie Go Camping, illustrator Pierre Probst, Collins Wonder Colour BooksBobs, Collins Wonder Colour BookBruiny and his Brothers, illustrator Pierre Probst, Little Gift BookThe Castle without a Door and Other Stories, PitkinThe Children at Green Meadows, illustrator Grace LodgeChristmas with Scamp and Bimbo, illustrator Pierre Probst, Collins Wonder Colour BooksThe Clever Little Donkey, Collins Wonder Colour BookClicky the Clown at the Circus, illustrator Molly BrettColin the Cow-Boy, illustrator R. Caille, Collins Wonder Colour BookEnid Blyton's Daffodil Story BookFive Go to Mystery Moor, illustrator Eileen Soper, Famous Five series 13Fun with the Twins, illustrator Eileen Soper, Little Books 16Enid Blyton's Friendly Story Book, illustrator Eileen SoperFavorite Book of Fables, Collins Wonder Colour BookGerry the Little Giraffe, Little Gift BookGood Work Secret Seven, illustrator Bruno Kay, Secret Seven series 6The Greatest Book in the World, illustrator Mabel CookThe Ninth Holiday BookHow Funny You Are, Noddy!, hardback strip bookThe Laughing KittenThe Little Toy Farm, PitkinEnid Blyton's Magazine Annual No. 1Enid Blyton's Marigold Story BookMary Mouse to the Rescue, illustrator Olive Openshaw, Mary Mouse 14Merry Mister Meddle!, illustrators Rosalind M. Turvey and Joyce MercerMore About Amelia Jane!, illustrator Rene Cloke, Amelia Jane 3The Mystery of Tally-Ho Cottage, illustrator Treyer Evans, The Five Find-Outers 12Neddy the Little Donkey, Collins Wonder Colour BookNoddy and Mr. Roundy in Clowntown, Noddy's Castle of Books 4Noddy and Mr. Cheery, Noddy's Castle of Books 5Noddy and the Magic Goldfish, Noddy's Castle of Books 2Noddy and the Magic Rubber, Noddy Library 9Noddy and the Snow-House, strip bookNoddy Gets into Trouble, illustrator Mary Brooks, Noddy Library 8Noddy Goes Dancing, strip bookNoddy Goes to the Fair, illustrator Charles SeezNoddy in the Land of King Ho–Ho, Noddy's Castle of Books 3Noddy the Cry-Baby, strip bookNoddy Visits the Land of Tops, Noddy's Castle of Books 1Scamp, Little Gift BookScamp and Bimbo, Collins Wonder Colour BookScamp at School, Collins Wonder Colour BookScamp and Caroline, illustrator Pierre Probst, Little Gift BookScamp Goes to the Zoo illustrator Pierre ProbstSooty illustrator Pierre Probst, Collins Wonder Colour BookTales After TeaThree Little Lions, Little Gift BookWhat a Surprise, illustrator Molly BrettWhat Shall I Be?, Collins Wonder Colour Book

1955About Silly SammyAbout the Doll that Fell out of the PramEnid Blyton's Annual (series produced by L. T. A. Robinson Ltd., some undated)Away Goes Sooty, illustrator Pierre Probst, Collins Wonder BookEnid Blyton's Seventh Bedside BookBenjy and the Others, illustrator Kathleen GellBible Stories from the Old TestamentBible Stories Old Testament IISixth Brer Rabbit BookMy Third Enid Blyton BookFive Have Plenty of Fun, illustrator Eileen Soper, Famous Five series 14Enid Blyton's Foxglove Story BookGobo in the Land of DreamsThe Golliwog Grumbled, illustrator Molly BrettHello, Little Noddy, strip bookTenth Holiday BookHoliday House, illustrator Grace LodgeEnid Blyton's Magazine Annual Number 2Mandy, Mops and Cubby and the WhitewashMary Mouse in Nursery Rhyme Land, illustrator Olive Openshaw, Mary Mouse 15Mischief AgainMore Chimney Corner StoriesMr Pink-Whistle's PartyMister Tumpy in the Land of Boys and Girls, illustrator Dorothy WheelerNew Big Noddy Book, illustrator Peter WienkNoddy in Toyland, Noddy Picture BookNoddy Meets Father Christmas, illustrator Mary Brooks, Noddy Library 11Playing at Home: A Novelty Book, illustrator Sabine SchweitzerThe River of Adventure, illustrator Stuart Tresilian, The Adventure Series 8Run-About's Holiday, illustrator Lilian ChiversScamp at School, illustrator Pierre ProbstSecret Seven Win Through, illustrator Bruno Kay, Secret Seven series 7Three Cheers for Noddy, strip book 5Trouble for the Twins, illustrator Eileen SoperThe Troublesome Three, illustrator LeoWho Will Hold the Giant, playYou Funny Little Noddy, Noddy Library 10

1956A Day with Mary Mouse, illustrator Frederick White, Mary Mouse 16Be Brave, Little Noddy!, Noddy Library 13Enid Blyton's Eighth Bedside BookNew Big Noddy Book 6Bom the Little Toy Drummer, illustrator R. Paul-HoyeThe Clever Little Donkey, illustrator Romain SimonA Day with Noddy, Noddy Picture BookFive on a Secret Trail, illustrator Eileen Soper, Famous Five series 15Four in a Family, illustrator Tom KerrLet's Have a PartyEnid Blyton's Magazine Annual Number 3The Mystery of the Missing Man, illustrator Lilian Buchanan, The Five Find-Outers 13Noddy and His Passengers, Noddy's Station of Books 1Noddy and Naughty Gobby, Noddy's Station of Books 4Noddy and Tessie Bear, Noddy Library 12Noddy and the Magic Boots, Noddy's Station of Books 2Noddy Be Careful!, strip book 6Noddy Flies a Kite, Noddy's Station of Books 3Noddy Has Hankie Troubles, Noddy's Station of Books 5Enid Blyton's Book of Her Famous Play Noddy in ToylandScamp at School, illustrator Pierre ProbstA Story Book of Jesus, illustrator Elsie WalkerThree Cheers Secret Seven, illustrator Burgess Sharrocks, Secret Seven series 8Water-Lily Story Book, illustrator Hilda Boswell and Dorothy Hall

1957Enid Blyton's Annual, illustrator Gilbert DunlopNinth Bedside BookBom and His Magic DrumstickBrer Rabbit Funtime AdventuresDo Look Out Noddy, Noddy Library 15Five Go to Billycock Hill, illustrator Eileen Soper, Famous Five series 16The Twelfth Holiday Book, illustrators Grace Lodge and Robert MacGillivrayEnid Blyton's Magazine Annual Number 4Mary Mouse and the Garden Party, illustrator Frederick White, Mary Mouse 17The Mystery of the Strange Messages, illustrator Lilian Buchanan, The Five Find-Outers 14New Testament Picture Books 1 and 2, illustrator Elsie WalkerNoddy and the Bear Who Lost His Growl, strip bookNoddy and the Bumpy-Dog, Noddy Library 14Noddy and the Tricky Teddy, strip bookNoddy Tricks Mr. Sly, strip bookNoddy's New Big Book 7Secret Seven Mystery, illustrator Burgess Sharrocks, Secret Seven series 9 (1st edition published by Brockhampton Press)

1958ABC with Noddy, Noddy Picture BookAbout Amanda Going AwayAbout the Wizard Who Really Was a NuisanceEnid Blyton's Tenth Bedside BookThe Birthday Kitten, illustrator Grace LodgeBom Annual, illustrator Paul Hoye and H.W. FelsteadBom Annual 2Bom Goes AdventuringBom Goes to Ho Ho VillageEighth Brer Rabbit BookBrer Rabbit Holiday AdventuresClicky Gets into TroubleFive Get into a Fix, illustrator Eileen Soper, Famous Five series 17Enid Blyton's Good Morning Book, illustrator Willy SchermeléEnid Blyton Holiday BookMary Mouse Goes to the Fair, illustrator Frederick White, Mary Mouse 18Mr Pink-Whistle's Big BookMy Big Ears Picture Book, 1958My Noddy Picture Book, Noddy Picture BookNew Big Noddy BookNoddy Buys a Spell, Noddy's Shop of Books 1Noddy Buys Tinny a Present, Noddy's Shop of Books 5Noddy Complains to Mr. Plod, Noddy's Shop of Books 4Noddy Drives Much Too Fast, Noddy's Shop of Books 3Noddy Has an Adventure, Noddy Library 17Noddy Helps Tinny Build a House, Noddy's Shop of Books 2Noddy Jingle BookNoddy's Own Nursery Rhymes, Noddy Board BookNoddy Painting BookPuzzle for the Secret Seven, illustrator Burgess Sharrocks, Secret Seven series 10Rumble and Chuff 1, 2, illustrator David WalshYou're a Good Friend, Noddy, Noddy Library 16

1959Adventure Stories (reprints Mischief at St. Rollo's and The Children of Kidillin)Eleventh Bedside BookBible Stories, New Testament Book 6 The Man by the Pool, The Poor LeperBig Noddy BookBom and the Clown, illustrator R. Paul-HoyeBom and the RainbowEnid Blyton's Book of the YearDog Stories (reprints Three Boys and a Circus and The Adventures of Scamp)The Famous Five Special (this is an out-of-series omnibus)Hullo, Bom and Wuffy Dog, strip bookHoliday BookMary Mouse Has a Wonderful Idea, illustrator Frederick White, Mary Mouse 19Mystery Stories (reprints The Secret of Cliff Castle and Smuggler Ben)Noddy and the Bunkey, Noddy Library 19Noddy Goes to Sea, Noddy Library 18Noddy's Car Picture Book, Noddy Picture BookNoddy's Grand Adventure, strip book 7The Ragamuffin Mystery, illustrator Anyon Cook, The Barney Mystery Series 6Secret Seven Fireworks, illustrator Burgess Sharrocks, Secret Seven series 11Enid Blyton's Story Book 1960s 
 1960–61 

1962A Day at School with Noddy, Noddy Picture BookFive Have a Mystery to Solve, illustrator Eileen Soper, Famous Five series 20Fun with Mary Mouse, illustrator R. Paul-Hoye, Mary Mouse 22The Four Cousins, illustrator Joan ThompsonThe Eighth Holiday BookLook Out Secret Seven, illustrator Burgess Shanks, Secret Seven series 14Noddy and the Tootles, Noddy Library 23Stories for Monday1963The Boy Who Wanted a Dog, illustrator Sally MichelBrer Rabbit Again, illustrator Grace LodgeBrer Rabbit Book, illustrator Grace Lodge (1st edition published by Dean & Sons Ltd.)Brer Rabbit's a Rascal, illustrator Grace LodgeChimney Corner StoriesFive Are Together Again, illustrator Eileen Soper, Famous Five series 21 (and final book)Five Have a Puzzling Time and Other StoriesFun for the Secret Seven, illustrator Burgess Sharrocks, Secret Seven series 15 (and final book)Noddy and the Aeroplane, Noddy Library 24Round the Clock StoriesShadow the SheepdogSunshine BookTales of Brave Adventure - 13 stories about Robin Hood, 14 stories about King Arthur (1st edition published by Dean & Sons Ltd.)Tales of Toyland1964The Dog without a CollarHappy Hours Story BookThe Hidey-Hole, illustrator Daphne RowlesMary Mouse and the Little Donkey, illustrator R. Paul-Hoye, Mary Mouse 23My Favourite Enid Blyton Story BookThe Enid Blyton Story Book for Fives to Sevens, illustrators Dorothy Hall and Grace SheltonStorytime BookFifth Tell-A-Story BookSixth Tell-A-Story BookSeventh Tell-A-Story BookEighth Tell-A-Story BookNinth Tell-A-Story BookTenth Tell-A-Story BookTinkle-Tinkle-Jingle-Jing1965The Boy Who Came Back, illustrator Elsie WalkerThe Dog Who Would Go Digging, John and Mary 3Easy Reader Books 1–4High Adventure with Enid Blyton, John and Mary StoriesEleventh Holiday BookLearn to Count with NoddyLearn to Read about Animals with NoddyLearn to Tell Time with NoddyThe Man Who Stopped To HelpNoddy and His Friends Nursery Picture Book, Noddy Picture BookNoddy's CarStoryland, 1 and 2Tales of Long Ago, illustrators Anne and Janet JohnstoneFifteenth Tell-A-Story BookEnid Blyton's Treasure BoxEnid Blyton's Sunshine Book1966Adventure for Goldie Sunshine Picture Story BookAnnabelle's Little Thimble, Tulip Book 2The Dog Without a Collar Sunshine Picture Story BookFairy Folk Story Book, illustrator Rene ClokeFireside TalesThe Grandpa Clock Sunshine Picture Story BookThe Great Big Fish, John and Mary 1The Higgledy Piggledy Goblins, Sunshine Picture Story BookThe High and Mighty Bear, Sunshine Picture Story BookHow John Got His Ducklings, John and MaryThe Lost Slippers, Tulip Book 3Pixieland Story Book, illustrator Rene ClokePlaytime Story Book 10Playtime Story Book 11Run-about's Holiday, illustrator Lilian ChiversStories for BedtimeStories for You (1st edition published by Dean & Sons Ltd.)Tales at Bedtime, illustrator Hilda McGavinThe Three Sailors, John and Mary 5The Wheel That Ran Away, John and Mary

1967Big Ears Board Book, Noddy Board BookHoliday Animal StoriesHoliday Magic StoriesHoliday Pixie StoriesHoliday Toy StoriesNoddy and his Passengers, Noddy Picture Book (title earlier)Noddy and the Magic Boots, Noddy Picture Book (title earlier)Noddy and the Noah's Ark, Noddy Picture BookNoddy Board Book, Noddy Board BookNoddy Toyland ABCNoddy's Aeroplane Picture Book, Noddy Picture BookNoddy's Funny KitePixie Tales1968Bedtime Annual, illustrator Jo BerrymanBrownie TalesGranny's Lovely NecklaceMy First Enid Blyton Sunshine ReaderPlaytime Story Book 5Published posthumously
 Anytime Tales (1971)
 The Dog with the Long Tail, and other stories (1975)More Wishing-Chair Stories (2000)
The Young Adventurers series (2004), originally published as the Riddle Series (1997) by HarperCollins.The Riddle of Holiday House The Riddle That Never Was The Riddle of The Rajah's Ruby The Riddle of The Hollow Tree The Riddle of The Hidden Treasure The Riddle of The Boy Next Door 

Unpublished 
 Mr Tumpy's Caravan (discovered in a collection of her papers, in 2011; not the 1949 publication of similar title)

References
John Cooper and Jonathan Cooper, Children's Fiction 1900–1950'' (1998), p. 177-8

Notes

External links
Enid Blyton Society – list of all books by date
Enid Blyton – Short stories list
 
Enid Blyton bibliography at Books and Writers
Enid Blyton bibliography at Foxall
Enid Blyton biography and bibliography at The Wee Web (link to archived version)

 
Bibliographies by writer
Bibliographies of British writers
Children's literature bibliographies